Crowded Paradise is a 1956 film starring Hume Cronyn and Nancy Kelly.  The movie was directed by Fred Pressburger.

Plot

Cast
Hume Cronyn as George Heath
Nancy Kelly as Louise Heath
Frank Silvera as Papa Diaz
Enid Rudd as Felicia Diaz
Mario Alcalde as Juan Figueroa
Stefan Schnabel as Big Man

External links 
 

1956 films
1956 drama films
American drama films
1950s English-language films
1950s American films
American black-and-white films